New York City's 39th City Council district is one of 51 districts in the New York City Council. It is currently represented by Democrat Shahana Hanif, who took office in 2022. Among the seat's prior occupants are former Mayor Bill de Blasio and current Comptroller Brad Lander.

Geography
District 39 is based in the Brooklyn neighborhood of Park Slope, also stretching west and south to cover Gowanus, Cobble Hill, Carroll Gardens, Columbia Waterfront, and parts of Windsor Terrace, Borough Park, and Kensington. Most of Prospect Park proper is also located within the district.

The district overlaps with Brooklyn Community Boards 2, 6, 7, 8, and 12, and with New York's 7th, 9th, and 10th congressional districts. It also overlaps with the 17th, 20th, 21st, 25th, and 26th districts of the New York State Senate, and with the 42nd, 44th, 48th, 51st, and 52nd districts of the New York State Assembly.

Recent election results

2021
In 2019, voters in New York City approved Ballot Question 1, which implemented ranked-choice voting in all local elections. Under the new system, voters have the option to rank up to five candidates for every local office. Voters whose first-choice candidates fare poorly will have their votes redistributed to other candidates in their ranking until one candidate surpasses the 50 percent threshold. If one candidate surpasses 50 percent in first-choice votes, then ranked-choice tabulations will not occur.

2017

2013

2009

References

New York City Council districts